Eastern Creek is a suburb of Sydney, in the state of New South Wales, Australia.

Eastern Creek is west of the Prospect Reservoir and is most notable for containing  Sydney Motorsport Park  (previously known as Eastern Creek Raceway), the Western Sydney International Dragway, and the former site of Wonderland Sydney amusement park.

History
The origin of the suburb's name lies in the fact the eastern branch of South Creek became known as Eastern Creek. The village that then grew where the road crossed the creek became known as Eastern Creek.

Population
In the 2016 Census, there were 827 people in Eastern Creek. 62.7% of people were born in Australia and 64.3% of people spoke only English at home. The most common responses for religion were Catholic 33.0% and No Religion 16.9%.

Commercial areas

Eastern Creek features many industrial developments and often the description 'Eastern Creek Area' also includes the industrial developments in the neighbouring suburbs of Arndell Park and Huntingwood. With this in mind most statistics and demographic information is not available for this suburb by itself. Eastern Creek Waste and Recycling Centre also takes up a large part of the suburb.

Recreation
Sydney Motorsport Park has hosted V8 Supercars events and hosted the Top Gear Festival on 8 and 9 March 2014. The Western Sydney International Dragway is located next to it.

Wonderland Sydney was a large amusement park that operated here between 1985 and 2004. Wonderland is now the site of a business park called Interchange Park.

The Western Sydney Parklands lies to the west of the suburb. Prospect Nature Reserve is situated to the east of the suburb, which provides recreational needs.

References

External links 

The 2001 City of Blacktown Social Plan 
Sydney Motorsport Park
Track Days
Driver Training
 V8 Hot Laps
 Ferrari Experience
Motorcycle Ride Days
Australian Racing Drivers' Club

Suburbs of Sydney
City of Blacktown